Fore was a constituency in County Westmeath represented in the Irish House of Commons from 1612 to 1800.

History
In the Patriot Parliament of 1689 summoned by James II, Fore was represented with two members.

Members of Parliament
1634–1635: Lucas Fitzgerald and Thomas Nugent (died 1634 and replaced by John Nugent)
1639–1649: John Nugent (died 1647 and replaced by Oliver Walshe)
1661–1666: Sir Timothy Tyrrill of Buckinghamshire (absent/died and replaced 1662 by Charles Viscount Falkland. Falkland died and was replaced 1663 by John Forrest) and William Markham

1689–1801

Notes

References

Bibliography

Constituencies of the Parliament of Ireland (pre-1801)
Historic constituencies in County Westmeath
1800 disestablishments in Ireland
Constituencies disestablished in 1800
1612 establishments in Ireland